Lieutenant John Arthur Aldridge  (9 February 1899 – November 1988) was a First World War flying ace credited with five aerial victories. He returned to the colours during the Second World War, joining the Air Training Corps.

Aldridge joined the Royal Flying Corps as an officer cadet, and was made a temporary second lieutenant on 24 May 1917. He received Royal Aero Club Aviator's Certificate 4846 on a Maurice Farman biplane at Ruislip on 16 June 1917. He was posted to No. 19 Squadron in early 1918, where he scored five victories flying the Sopwith Dolphin between April and September. He officially left the RAF on 12 January 1919.

On 18 June 1919, Alridge joined the Board of Agriculture and Fisheries as an Assistant Clerk (Abstractor).

During Second World War, he served in the Training Branch of the RAF, with the rank of pilot officer, until 31 March 1945.

He became Secretary at the Veterinary Laboratory near Woking, and in December 1948 was appointed a Member of the Order of the British Empire for his work in the Civil Service.

References

1899 births
1988 deaths
Royal Flying Corps officers
People from North Hertfordshire District
British World War I flying aces
Recipients of the Croix de guerre (Belgium)
Members of the Order of the British Empire
Military personnel from Hertfordshire
Royal Air Force personnel of World War I